Uno Pizzeria & Grill (formerly Pizzeria Uno and Uno Chicago Grill), or more informally as Unos, is a franchised pizzeria restaurant chain under the parent company Uno Restaurant Holdings Corporation. Uno Pizzeria and Grill is best known for its Chicago-style deep dish pizza. Ike Sewell opened the first Pizzeria Uno in 1943.

History

Founding and original locations 
The first Uno's was established in 1943 by former University of Texas football star Ike Sewell and his friend, former World War II G.I. Ric Riccardo, in the River North neighborhood of Chicago, Illinois. Sewell originally intended to open a Mexican restaurant because "there wasn't a really decent Mexican restaurant in Chicago then."

While Sewell and Riccardo are known as the owners of the original restaurant, a 1956 article from the Chicago Daily News asserts that the original deep-dish pizza recipe was created by chef Rudy Malnati Sr., the father of Lou Malnati.  Pizzeria Uno claims to have originated the deep dish pizza.

Sewell opened two additional restaurants in response to Pizzeria Uno's popularity. Pizzeria Due opened one block north of the original Pizzeria Uno location in 1955 (Uno and Due are Italian for one and two).  This was followed by the launch of Su Casa, an upscale Mexican restaurant, in 1965. Su Casa is located adjacent to Pizzeria Due.

Franchising and expansion 

Ike Sewell first franchised the name and concept of the restaurant to the Uno Restaurant Holdings Corporation in 1978 in the Boston area. Beginning with four restaurants in Massachusetts, the chain rapidly expanded over the next decade. After Ike Sewell's death in 1990, his widow Florence sold the original properties (Uno, Due, and Su Casa) to the Boston-based corporation. CEO Aaron Spencer promised not to tamper with pizza at the original locations. The restaurant chain does not have a major presence in the Chicago Metropolitan Area, with only the original Uno, Due, and Su Casa restaurants in River North. As of July 2017, Massachusetts, with 23, had the most Uno restaurants.

The company began franchising in 1980.
 the company has 102 Uno Pizzeria & Grill restaurants located in 21 U.S. states plus one in the District of Columbia. Some regions have been more favorable to Uno than others. The East Coast/Midwest region continues to see growth. However, despite an aggressive push into the Southern and Western markets in the 1990s, those gains were greatly reduced as many locations closed. Franchises are also located in Honduras, South Korea, Saudi Arabia, United Arab Emirates. and Kolkata (India).

Entrepreneur magazine ranked it 174th in 2003 and 252nd in 2006 in the magazine's list of the top 500 franchises. In November 2009, the company announced that after a successful pilot of Uno Express, which offers fast food, it will open at least 160 new Uno Express locations throughout 2010 into 2011.

In addition to the traditional Uno restaurants, Uno offers a limited menu (mostly its pizzas) at stadiums, service plazas, and airports. Uno-branded pizzas, both thin-crust and deep-dish, are available in both fresh and frozen forms in many US supermarkets.

Format changes 

Starting in 1994, Uno's broadened its menu to encompass other dishes. Uno's kitchens were updated, adding sauté stations, grills, and fryers, and the company invested heavily in training.

In 1996, the franchise's beverage list was expanded, and by 1999 so was the portion size, reflecting a trend seen in the industry where customers are buying fewer but larger drinks. New locations were larger and featured a "Chicago warehouse" look.

In 1997, Pizzeria Uno changed its name to Pizzeria Uno, Chicago Bar & Grill; it later simplified the name to Uno Chicago Grill.

The menu, updated again in 2005, still includes several of the restaurant's traditional specialties, particularly its deep dish pizza. In the tradition of Chicago's speakeasies, more attention is paid to the bar. Uno's drink list features a dozen wines and a number of specialty drinks, including frozen, mixed and nonalcoholic options.

The expanded menu and format changes were not made at the company's original Chicago locations (Pizzeria Uno and Pizzeria Due).

Bankruptcy 
Uno Restaurant Holdings Corp. closed 16 of its restaurants and filed for Chapter 11 protection on January 20, 2010. The company's initial stated intention at the time of the bankruptcy filing was to convert $142 million of Senior Secured Notes due 2011 into the new equity of the company after emergence from Chapter 11.  It emerged from bankruptcy on July 26, 2010, after restructuring to eliminate $14.2 million in annual interest payments and reduce total debt from $176.3 million to $40 million.

Uno Due Go 

The company launched a fast casual spinoff, called Uno Due Go, in 2008.  The spinoff has since closed all locations as of 2020 with the Boston location closing due to a downturn in business due to COVID-19. The new restaurant chain featured pizza, sandwiches, salads, and bakery items. There were four locations as of April 15, 2016, mostly in airports and universities, with one in downtown Boston, compared to more than 140 locations for the traditional Pizzeria Uno restaurants.

See also 
 List of pizza chains of the United States

References

External links 
 

1943 establishments in Illinois
Companies based in Boston
Companies that filed for Chapter 11 bankruptcy in 2010
Frozen food brands
Pizza chains of the United States
Pizza franchises
Restaurant chains in the United States
Restaurants established in 1943
Restaurants in Chicago
Italian restaurants in the United States